Bylas is an unincorporated community and census-designated place in Graham County, Arizona, United States, located within the San Carlos Apache Indian Reservation. As of the 2010 census, its population was 1,962. The community has a medical clinic, a police substation, and a market. Bylas is an Apache settlement divided into two communities, one of the White Mountain Apache, the other of San Carlos and Southern Tonto Apache. It is named for Bylas (a.k.a. Bailish) a chief of the Eastern White Mountain Apache band.

Geography
Bylas is located at  (33.1386688, -110.1250875), at an elevation of 2,608 feet (795 m).

Demographics

Bylas' population in 1960 was estimated as 500.

Bylas appeared on the 1970 U.S. Census as an unincorporated village. In 1980, it was made a census-designated place (CDP). In 2000, it did not initially appear on the census returns, but the census viewer page later returned a population of 1,147. It appeared normally again as a CDP on the 2010 returns.

Transportation
The road is served by U.S. Route 70.

San Carlos Apache Nnee Bich'o Nii Transit provides transportation on the reservation and to Safford and Globe.  Greyhound Lines serves Bylas on its Phoenix-El Paso via Globe route.

Notable person
 Chesley Goseyun Wilson, Apache fiddle maker and player, National Heritage Award winner (1989)

Climate
According to the Köppen Climate Classification system, Bylas has a semi-arid climate, abbreviated "BSk" on climate maps.

See also
 Safford micropolitan area

References

External links
 Hometown Locator Bylas
 Epodunk Bylas
 USA Cities Online Bylas

Census-designated places in Graham County, Arizona
Safford, Arizona micropolitan area